John Allan Barnes Paddock FRSA (born 8 August 1951) is a retired Anglican priest and former Dean of Gibraltar.

Paddock was born in Gloucester and educated at The Crypt School, Gloucester, and the University of Liverpool, the University of Manchester (PGCE, 1975), the University of Oxford (MA, 1981), the University of Glasgow (PhD, 2005) and Cardiff University (LLM). He was ordained deacon in 1980 and priest in  1981. After a curacy at St Katharine's  Matson he was a chaplain at the Lancaster Royal Grammar School and then with the RAF. He then held further school chaplaincies at St Olave's Grammar School, Orpington, and Royal Russell School, Croydon. From 1997 to 2000 he was the vicar of St Peter's Folkestone and from then until his appointment as the Dean of Gibraltar. Paddock retired in November 2017

References

1951 births
Living people
People educated at The Crypt School, Gloucester
Alumni of the University of Liverpool
Alumni of the University of Manchester
Alumni of the University of Oxford
Alumni of the University of Glasgow
Alumni of Cardiff University
Deans of Gibraltar
People from Gloucester